The Florida Legislature is the legislature of the U.S. State of Florida. It is organized as a bicameral body composed of an upper chamber, the Senate, and a lower chamber, the House of Representatives. Article III, Section 1 of the Florida Constitution, adopted in 1968, defines the role of the legislature and how it is to be constituted. The legislature is composed of 160 state legislators (120 in the House and 40 in the Senate). The primary purpose of the legislature is to enact new laws and amend or repeal existing laws. It meets in the Florida State Capitol building in Tallahassee.

Titles
Members of the Senate are referred to as senators and members of the House of Representatives are referred to as representatives. Because this shadows the terminology used to describe members of Congress, constituents and the news media, using  The Associated Press Stylebook, often refer to legislators as state senators or state representatives to avoid confusion with their federal counterparts.

Florida Senate

The Senate is the upper house of the state legislature. It consists of 40 members elected from single-member districts. Senators are elected on a partisan basis, typically to four-year staggered terms, with half of the Senate elected every two years. Senate districts are drawn based on population figures from the federal decennial census. In the first election after the redistricting, all seats are up for election. Senators' terms begin immediately upon their election. The Senate Chamber is located in the State Capitol building. As of 2022, Republicans hold the majority in the Senate with 28 seats; Democrats are in the minority with 12 seats.

Florida House of Representatives

The House of Representatives is the lower house of the state legislature. It consists of 120 members elected from single-member districts, on a partisan basis, to two-year terms. Districts are drawn based on population figures from the federal decennial census. House districts are drawn independently of Senate districts; some representatives have districts that include parts of multiple Senate districts. Representatives' terms begin immediately upon their election. The House of Representatives Chamber is located in the State Capitol building. As of 2022, Republicans hold the majority in the House of Representatives with 84 seats, and Democrats hold 35 seats. One seat is vacant.

Terms
Article III of the Florida Constitution defines the terms for state legislators. Legislators take office immediately upon election.

Senate
The Constitution requires state senators from odd-numbered districts to be elected in the years that end in numbers which are multiples of four. Senators from even-numbered districts are required to be elected in even-numbered years the numbers of which are not multiples of four.

To reflect the results of the U.S. Census and the redrawing of district boundaries, all seats are up for election in redistricting years, with some terms truncated as a result. Thus, senators in even-numbered districts were elected to two-year terms in 2012 (following the 2010 Census), and senators in odd-numbered districts will be elected to two-year terms in 2022 (following the 2020 Census).

All terms were truncated again in 2016, with all 40 Senate seats up for election, due to court-ordered redistricting.

House of Representatives 
Members of the House of Representatives are elected for terms of two years in each even-numbered year.

Term limits
On November 3, 1992, almost 77 percent of Florida voters backed Amendment 9, the Florida Term Limits Amendment, which amended the State Constitution, to enact eight-year term limits on federal and state officials. Under the amendment, former members can be elected again after a two-year break. In 1995, the U.S. Supreme Court ruled that states could not enact congressional term limits, but ruled that the state-level term limits remain.

Qualifications
Florida legislators must be at least twenty-one years old, an elector and resident of their district, and must have resided in Florida for at least two years before an election.

Legislative session
Each year during which the Legislature meets constitutes a new Legislative Session.

Committee weeks
Legislators start Committee activity in September of the year before the Regular Legislative Session. Because Florida is a part-time legislature, this is necessary to allow legislators time to work their bills through the Committee process, before the Regular Legislative Session.

Regular legislative session
The Florida Legislature meets in a 60-day Regular Legislative Session each year. Regular Legislative Sessions in odd-numbered years must begin on the first Tuesday after the first Monday in March and on the second Tuesday after the first Monday in January of each even-numbered year.

Before 1991, the Regular Legislative Session began in April. Senate Joint Resolution 380 (1989) proposed to the voters a Constitutional Amendment (approved November 1990) that shifted the starting date of Regular Legislative Session from April to February. Subsequently, Senate Joint Resolution 2606 (1994) proposed to the voters a Constitutional Amendment (approved November 1994) shifting the start date to March, where it remains. In recent years, the Legislature has opted to start in January to allow lawmakers to be home with their families during school spring breaks, and to give more time ahead of the legislative elections in the Fall.

Organizational session
On the fourteenth day following each General Election, the Legislature meets for an Organizational Session to organize and select officers.

Special session
Special Legislative Sessions may be called by the governor, by a joint proclamation of the Senate president and House speaker, or by a three-fifths vote of all Legislators. During any Special Session, the Legislature may only address legislative business that is within the purview of the purpose or purposes stated in the Special Session Proclamation.

Powers and process

The Florida Legislature is authorized by the Florida Constitution to create and amend the laws of the U.S. state of Florida, subject to the Governor's power to veto legislation. To do so, Legislators propose legislation in the forms of bills drafted by a nonpartisan, professional staff. Successful legislation must undergo Committee review, three readings on the floor of each house, with appropriate voting majorities, as required, and either be signed into law by the Governor or enacted through a veto override approved by two-thirds of the membership of each legislative house.

Its statutes, called "chapter laws" or generically as "slip laws" when printed separately, are compiled into the Laws of Florida and are called "session laws". The Florida Statutes are the codified statutory laws of the state.

In 2009, legislators filed 2,138 bills for consideration. On average, the Legislature has passed about 300 bills into law annually.

In 2013, the legislature filed about 2000 bills. About 1000 of these are "member bills." The remainder are bills by committees responsible for certain functions, such as budget. In 2016, about 15% of the bills were passed.
In 2017, 1,885 lobbyists registered to represent  3,724 entities.

The Legislature also has the power to propose amendments to the Florida Constitution.

Leadership

The House of Representatives is headed by the speaker of the House, while the Senate is headed by the Senate president. The House speaker and Senate president control the assignment of committees and leadership positions, along with control of the agenda in their chambers. The two leaders, along with the governor of Florida, control most of the agenda of state business in Florida.

President of the Senate: Kathleen Passidomo (R)
President Pro Tempore of the Florida Senate: Dennis Baxley (R)
Majority Leader of the Florida Senate: Ben Albritton (R)
Minority Leader of the Florida Senate: Lauren Book (D)
Speaker of the Florida House: Paul Renner (R)
Speaker Pro Tempore of the Florida House: Chuck Clemons (R)
Majority Leader of the Florida House: Michael J. Grant (R)
Minority Leader of the Florida House: Fentrice Driskell (D)

See also

Florida House of Representatives
Florida Senate
Florida Senate Majority Office
Florida State Capitol
Government of Florida
List of presidents of the Florida Senate
List of speakers of the Florida House of Representatives
 List of Florida state legislatures
The Florida Channel

References

External links
Florida Legislature

 
Bicameral legislatures
Government of Florida
1839 establishments in Florida Territory